is a Japanese manga series written and illustrated by Taiyō Matsumoto. It has been serialized in Shogakukan's seinen manga magazine Big Comic Original Zōkan since June 2019.

Publication
Written and illustrated by Taiyō Matsumoto, Tokyo Higoro started in Shogakukan's seinen manga magazine  on June 12, 2019. Shogakukan released the first collected wideban volume on August 30, 2021.

Volume list

Reception
Tokyo Higoro ranked third on Takarajimasha's Kono Manga ga Sugoi! 2022 list of best manga for male readers. The manga placed second on "The Best Manga 2022 Kono Manga wo Yome!" ranking by Freestyle magazine; it ranked fifth on the 2023 edition. It has been nominated for the 27th Tezuka Osamu Cultural Prize in 2023.

Writer and editor Kazushi Shimada ranked it 2nd on his top 10 manga of 2021.

References

Further reading

External links
 

Seinen manga
Shogakukan manga